The Cannady–Brogden Farm is a historic home and farm located near Creedmoor, Wake County, North Carolina. Built in 1904, the house is an example of a Queen Anne style, triple-A-roofed, I-shaped building. In addition to the house, other structures on the farm include: a corn crib, a woodshed, a washhouse, a covered well, a chicken coop, a smokehouse, a stackhouse, a packhouse, a machinery shed, a mule barn, a cow shed, and a tobacco barn.

In April 2001, the Cannady–Brogden Farm was listed on the National Register of Historic Places.

See also
 List of Registered Historic Places in North Carolina

References

Farms on the National Register of Historic Places in North Carolina
Houses completed in 1904
Queen Anne architecture in North Carolina
Houses in Wake County, North Carolina
National Register of Historic Places in Wake County, North Carolina